McGaughey and Davies v Universities Superannuation Scheme Ltd [2022] EWHC 1233 (Ch) is a UK company law, climate litigation, and pension law case, seeking permission for a derivative claim to enforce duties of the directors of the UK university pension fund, USS Ltd. The case is the first to sue for directors of a major UK corporation to divest fossil fuels, and is the first case of beneficiaries of a pension corporation bringing a derivative claim for breaches of directors' statutory duties.

The High Court accepted that the claimants had standing to bring a derivative claim, but refused permission based on the rule in Foss v Harbottle. The claimants secured permission to appeal to the Court of Appeal with a hearing in June 2023.

Facts
The claimants alleged that directors of the Universities Superannuation Scheme Ltd had breached their statutory duties to act for proper purposes, act in good faith, and avoid conflicts of interest, and applied to bring a derivative claim in the company’s name against the directors. Since 2018, major strikes took place in UK universities after the CEO Bill Galvin attempted to remove the guaranteed pension from university staff: this was halted after sector-wide strikes, and Oxford University staff threatened to remove the Vice Chancellor unless the pension cuts were opposed. Subsequently the planned pension cuts were halted. In 2019, the board of USS Ltd voted to pass a special resolution to ensure that they could not be removed except by the existing board (rather than by university employers and the University and College Union). At a board meeting, the CEO Bill Galvin stated “DB pensions in the UK have failed. That is not controversial.” In March 2020, USS Ltd conducted a valuation of pension assets when the stock market had crashed due to the Covid-19 pandemic. This predicted that there would be a £17.9 billion deficit in the pension fund, on the assumption that assets would grow at 0.0% for 30 years (later changed to a 0.29% assumption). In November 2020, USS conducted an Ethical Investment Survey, which showed that a majority of university staff wished to divest from fossil fuels, but it did not act or publish the Survey results. As a result of the deficit predictions in the March 2020 valuation, USS and university employers proposed cutting pension benefits in April 2022. The claimants, Prof Neil Davies and Dr Ewan McGaughey, then filed their action after crowd-funding money for the claims that:
conducting a valuation of assets with an assumption of 0.29% growth over the next 30 years and predicting deficits breached the duty to act for proper purposes under the Companies Act 2006 section 171(b), 
the resulting benefit cuts have a discriminatory impact on women, young people and on grounds of race, contrary to the duties in the Equality Act 2010 sections 19 and 61, and the duty to act for proper purposes,
the directors wasted beneficiaries' money by inflating operating costs, contrary to the duty to avoid any possibility of a conflict of interest under the Companies Act 2006 section 175, and 
the directors unlawfully failed to divest or have any plan for divesting fossil fuels, which posed a "significant risk of financial detriment", in light of the right to life under the Companies Act 2006 section 171 and the Human Rights Act 1998 section 3, and in light of the beneficiaries' expressed preferences. 

In March 2022, after the Russian invasion of Ukraine, USS announced £450 million of losses in Russian investments, including fossil fuels. In April 2022 it pressed ahead with cuts to the pension, reducing the defined benefit pension threshold from £60,000 to £40,000, reducing accrual rates from 1/75th of salary per year to 1/85th, and reducing the inflation cap, estimated to be a 30% cut to an average pension. 

After the High Court hearing, and following the UK mini-budget, the CEO Bill Galvin announced his resignation.

Judgment

High Court
Justice Leech in the High Court held that, while beneficiaries of a pension fund corporation could bring derivative claims, the Court of Appeal decision in Harris v Microfusion and the rule in Foss v Harbottle meant that the claimants had to show they suffered loss reflected by a loss to the company, and that the directors 'benefited themselves from the breach of duty'. It followed that the claimants' claims for breach of duty to act for proper purposes could not be brought, including the claims alleging misconduct in the valuation and discrimination, and claims alleging a significant risk of financial detriment in the failure to divest fossil fuels or have a plan. The Judge added that the claimants had failed to state sufficiently what the losses from fossil fuels were.

Court of Appeal
The claimants applied for permission to appeal to the Court of Appeal, and received permission from Lewison LJ for a hearing in 2023. The claimants alleged that the High Court applied the wrong legal tests, that all duties under the Companies Act 2006 must be capable of enforcement, and that key parts of their evidence on the imprudent valuation assumptions, and the risk of significant financial detriment from fossil fuels were missed.

Significance
The case was the first in the UK to bring actions against directors personally for their failure to divest fossil fuels in light of climate risk. Solicitors at Ince stated that despite the High Court's rejection, the case showed "there is an increasing momentum by activists, shareholders and others to hold them accountable for climate change."

See also
Climate litigation
2018–2023 UK higher education strikes

Notes

External links
Court case summary from the claimants
S Rust, 'UK court denies permission for claims against USS trustee directors to proceed' (24 May 2022) IPE
E McGaughey, ‘Holding USS Directors Accountable, and the Start of the End for Foss v Harbottle?’ (18 July 2022) Oxford Business Law Blog
B Mercer, 'Lecturers’ USS lawsuit frustrated by centuries-old precedent' (24 May 2022) Pensions Expert

Climate change litigation
Climate change law
United Kingdom company case law
United Kingdom labour case law